Mexico–Uruguay relations are foreign relations between Mexico and Uruguay. Both nations are members of the  Latin American Integration Association, Organization of American States, Organization of Ibero-American States and the United Nations.

History

Historically, both countries were part of the Spanish Empire until the early 19th century. Mexico was part of Viceroyalty of New Spain while Uruguay was part of the Viceroyalty of the Río de la Plata. Soon after independence, both nations established diplomatic relations on 22 February 1831. In 1882, Uruguay established a consulate in Mexico City. In 1941, Mexico elevates its diplomatic mission in Montevideo to an embassy with Uruguay doing so two years later in 1943.

During the 1970s and 1980s, Uruguay went through a Civic-military dictatorship. During that time several dissidents were killed and 'disappeared'. Many also immigrated abroad and sought refuge in many countries throughout the world, including Mexico. Since the return of democracy to Uruguay, diplomatic relations between Mexico and Uruguay have continued unabated. When Mexico received much negative publicity following the outbreak of swine flu in 2009, Uruguay was said to have “never closed its doors to Mexico”.

2009 Strategic Association accord 
On 14 August 2009, President of Mexico Felipe Calderón and President of Uruguay Tabaré Vázquez met in Montevideo. Calderón was on the second part of a South American tour, during which he also met President of Colombia Álvaro Uribe in a tour which also involved a visit to Brazil. In Montevideo, Calderón and Vázquez signed a deal which was intended to further advance the free trade agreement of 2004. It was said to have been worth $500 million. Deals concerning air connections, scientific research concerning Antarctica, education, tax avoidance and tax evasion, and "the protection, conservation, recovery and restitution of cultural assets which have been robbed or illicitly traded" were also signed. Calderón called the deal "a milestone in our bilateral relation, which brings our peoples closer and further promotes trade".

As well as signing these agreements, Calderón carried out several other functions during this visit to Uruguay. He participated in the Plan Ceibal, an initiative to provide laptops to schoolchildren and improve internet access, by visiting the school which was to receive the 300,000th laptop in this scheme. Following on from this, Calderón met Vice-President of Uruguay Rodolfo Nin Novoa and addressed the country's parliament, where he informed Uruguay that “a highly sensitive export issue for Uruguay, such as is beef, which has faced ongoing difficulties, as of now, following this visit, will be removed” and said he agreed with Colombia's decision to allow its military bases be opened to the United States. Calderon stayed in Uruguay for the weekend before leaving to visit Brazil.

Venezuela Crisis 
In February 2019, Mexican Foreign Minister Marcelo Ebrard paid a visit to Uruguay where he met with President Vázquez and Foreign Minister Rodolfo Nin Novoa to discuss the ongoing Crisis in Venezuela and presidential crisis and for both nations to mediate in the crisis. Since the meeting, Uruguay has announced its support of incumbent President Nicolás Maduro while Mexico's maintains its neutrality.

High-level visits

Presidential visits from Mexico to Uruguay

 President Gustavo Díaz Ordaz (1967)
 President Miguel de la Madrid Hurtado (1988)
 President Carlos Salinas de Gortari (1990)
 President Ernesto Zedillo (1999)
 President Vicente Fox (2002, 2006)
 President Felipe Calderón (2009)
 President Enrique Peña Nieto (2013)

Presidential visits from Uruguay to Mexico

 President Julio María Sanguinetti (1986, 1987, 1996, 1999)
 President Luis Alberto Lacalle (1993)
 President Jorge Batlle Ibáñez (2002, January and May 2004)
 President Tabaré Vázquez (2006, 2017, 2018)
 President José Mujica (2011, 2014)
 President Luis Lacalle Pou (2021)

Bilateral agreements
Both nations have signed several bilateral agreements such as an Agreement on Cultural Exchanges; Agreement on Scientific and Technical Cooperation; Agreement on Tourism Cooperation; Agreement for the Prevention of the Misuse and Repression of Illicit Trafficking of Narcotic Drugs and Psychotropic Substances and their Precursors and Products Essential Chemicals; Extradition Treaty; Agreement for the Promotion and Reciprocal Protection of Investments; Treaty on Mutual Legal Assistance Cooperation in Criminal Matters; Agreement on Air Transportation; Agreement to Avoid Double Taxation and Prevent Tax Evasion in Tax Matters on Income and Equity and an Agreement of Cooperation in Protection, Conservation, Recovery and Restitution of Cultural goods.

Trade
In July 2004, both nations signed a free trade agreement. In 2018, trade between the two nations amounted to US$560 million. Mexico's main exports to Uruguay include: vehicles, televisions and tractors. Uruguay's main exports to Mexico include: leather, dairy and food products. Mexico is Uruguay's fourth biggest trading partner while Uruguay is Mexico's fifteenth largest trading partner globally. Foreign direct investment from Mexico to Uruguay amounted to US$200 million in 2011. Between 1999 and 2018, Uruguayan direct investment in Mexico amounted to US$364 million. Mexican multinational companies such as América Móvil, Binbit, Gruma, Grupo Bimbo and Grupo Omnilife (among others) operate in Uruguay.

Resident diplomatic missions
 Mexico has an embassy in Montevideo.
 Uruguay has an embassy in Mexico City.

See also 
 Uruguayans in Mexico

References 

 

 
Uruguay
Bilateral relations of Uruguay